Florence White or Miss F. White (c.1860s – 1932) was a British portrait and miniature painter.

She showed works from 1881 to 1917. Her work White Treasures was included in the book Women Painters of the World. She was a member of the Society of Lady Artists.

References

White, F. (Miss) 8, Bolton Studios, South Kensington—1367, 1368, 1369, 1389 listed in the catalog of The Exhibition of the Royal Academy of Arts MDCCCC : the one hundred and thirty-second, 1900
1107 Portrait of Mrs. Bowater Vernon mentioned by Miss Florence White, in the "Watercolour Room" of the exhibition of the Royal Academy of Arts, 1911

1860s births
1932 deaths
British women painters
British portrait painters
Portrait miniaturists
19th-century British painters
19th-century British women artists
20th-century British painters
20th-century British women artists